Crime in Paradise (Swedish: Brott i paradiset) is a 1959 Swedish crime thriller film directed by Lars-Eric Kjellgren and starring Harriet Andersson,  Gunnar Björnstrand and Karl-Arne Holmsten. It was shot at the Råsunda Studios in Stockholm and on location around the city. The film's sets were designed by the art director P.A. Lundgren.

Synopsis 
During a robbery, a safe is blown up and a nightwatchman is accidentally killed. Ten years later his stepson receives information about the crime, and joins forces with Eva a crime reporter.

Cast
 Harriet Andersson as 	Eva Malmborg
 Gunnar Björnstrand as 	Adam 'A.P.' Palmquist
 Karl-Arne Holmsten as 	Einar Hansson
 Gerd Hagman as 	Vivi Karlén
 Bengt Eklund as 	Tage Skoglund
 Torsten Lilliecrona as Torsten Lindgren
 Sven-Eric Gamble as 	Harry Lindgren
 Helge Hagerman as 	Gunnar Berg
 Hugo Björne as 	Arnold Jörner
 Inga Gill as 	Tobacconist
 Birgitta Andersson as 	Cigarette Girl
 Elsa Ebbesen as 	Mrs. Hansson
 Bengt Blomgren as 	Nystedt
 Mona Andersson as 	Waitress 
 Sten Ardenstam as 	Police Detective 
 Birgit Aronsson as Beauty Parlor Receptionist 
 Greta Berthels as 	Mrs. Johansson 
 Axel Bjelvén as 	Nightwatchman 
 Sven-Axel Carlsson as 	Flower Messenger 
 Karl Erik Flens as 	Police Detective
 Göthe Grefbo as 	Doorman 
 Hans-Erik Holm as 	Boström 
 Maud Hyttenberg as 	Waitress 
 Karl Jonsson as 	Restaurant Guest
 Ludde Juberg as 	Janitor 
 Ragnar Klange as 	Wallmark 
 Sonja Kolthoff as 	Red Cross Woman 
 Bengt Lindström as 	Police Detective 
 Carin Lundquist as 	Alcohol Cashier 
 Marrit Ohlsson as 	Cold Cuts Preparer 
 Mille Schmidt as 	Cook 
 Waldemar Thulin as 	Restaurant Guest 
 Bengt von Strauss as Journalist 
 Herbert Wellander as 	Monsieur Pierre 
 Sioma Zubicky as 	Xylophone Player

References

Bibliography 
 Qvist, Per Olov & von Bagh, Peter. Guide to the Cinema of Sweden and Finland. Greenwood Publishing Group, 2000.

External links 
 

1959 films
Swedish crime films
1959 crime films
Swedish thriller films
1950s thriller films
1950s Swedish-language films
Films directed by Lars-Eric Kjellgren
Swedish black-and-white films
1950s Swedish films